Abdul Aziz (born 4 June 1970) is an Indonesian politician who is a member of the People's Representative Council from the United Development Party. He was appointed by his party in 2018 to the position to replace the resigning Dimyati Natakusumah.

Biography
Abdul Aziz was born in Jakarta on 4 June 1970 and completed his education there, obtaining a bachelor's degree from an economic higher education institute. 

He was appointed to the People's Representative Council to replace Dimyati Natakusumah on 31 October 2018, as the latter changed parties to the Prosperous Justice Party. He became part of the body's sixth commission. In December 2018, he defended some state owned companies which were recording losses, noting that some of those companies were subsidising their products.

References

1970 births
Living people
Politicians from Jakarta
Members of the People's Representative Council, 2014
United Development Party politicians